Käo may refer: 

Käo, Saare County, village in Laimjala Parish, Saare County, Estonia
Käo, Tartu County, village in Rõngu Parish, Tartu County, Estonia
Henno Käo (1942–2004), Estonian children's writer, book illustrator, poet, and musician

Estonian-language surnames